The Downs Light Railway is the world's oldest private miniature railway, with a track gauge of . The railway is located within the grounds of The Downs Malvern, a private school in Colwall, near the town of Malvern, Worcestershire in the English Midlands. It is owned by the Downs Light Railway Trust.

The Downs Light Railway is maintained and operated principally by the school children, aged between 7 and 13 years. It provides a wide range of educational and regular extra-curricular activities, and supports other local schools. As of 2019, it is part of the Heritage Railway Association membership.

History
The railway was built and opened in 1925 under the guidance of Geoffrey Hoyland (Headmaster) as a  gauge railway, for the principal purpose of education. After Hoyland fell ill and retired from the school, the railway deteriorated until it became unsafe to use by the late 1960s.

During the 1970s, restoration work began by former pupils of the school, most notably James Boyd. In 1983, the railway was handed over to the Downs Light Railway Trust, who became responsible for its ownership, preservation and operation.

In June 2021 the railway was presented with the Heritage Railway Association's Small Groups Award.

Locomotives

Orion paid a visit on 24 April 2005 for its first public steaming in many years, following its disappearance, rediscovery and restoration.

References

Notes

Bibliography

External links
 The Down Light Railway Trust
 The Downs Preparatory School

Miniature railways in the United Kingdom
Rail transport in Herefordshire
Railway lines opened in 1925
Children's railways